The 50th Grey Cup, also known as the Fog Bowl, was the 1962 Grey Cup Canadian Football League championship game played between the Winnipeg Blue Bombers and the Hamilton Tiger-Cats on December 1, 1962, at Toronto's Exhibition Stadium. It remains the only Grey Cup game ever suspended during play, and the first to be finished on a Sunday. The Grey Cup was won by the Blue Bombers with the score of 28–27 in 1962 and it's still considered to be one of the ten best Grey Cup games of all time.

Fog Bowl
The game started normally on Saturday, December 1. However, by the second quarter, a thick fog started to roll in over the field, a combination of cold, moist, humid air from Lake Ontario. The fog was thick enough that fans could not see the action on the field, receivers lost sight of the ball after it left the quarterbacks' hand, and punt returners could not find punts until they hit the ground.

The fog became worse as the afternoon wore on, and with 9 minutes and 29 seconds left in the fourth quarter, the game was suspended with Winnipeg leading 28–27. The game continued the following afternoon, but there was no further scoring, thus securing the Bomber win.

Game summary

The 1962 championship will always be remembered for what the fans could not see. Following a year when the Winnipeg Blue Bombers and Hamilton Tiger-Cats made Canadian football history by playing in the first Grey Cup to go to overtime, the two clubs battled again in another memorable meeting. But not because of the play on the field.

Thick advection fog rolled in prior to halftime. The dense fog restricted visibility to the all present fans who was watching the game. Players could also not see and find the ball during passes and punts. The reduce visibility made it difficult to the referees to properly officiate. Paul Dojack, a referee stopped or postponed the game with Winnipeg leading 28–27. After a 20-minute delay, CFL commissioner Syd Halter decided that the remainder of the game would be played the following afternoon.

The Tiger-Cats drew first blood in the opening quarter when Garney Henley took advantage of some good blocking and sprinted 74 yards for a major. The convert by Don Sutherin was no good, his first of three key errors in the game. A 41-yard run by Kenny Ploen set up a Leo Lewis touchdown to begin a wild second quarter, giving Winnipeg a 7–6 lead. Lewis struck again when he took a handoff, ran wide and threw a 15-yard pass to Charlie Shepard in the end zone.

Hamilton cut the deficit to 14–12, first on a goal-line leap by Bobby Kuntz, then on an 18-yard touchdown run by Henley following a Winnipeg fumble. Sutherin was only good on one convert however, giving the Ticats a 19–14 advantage. Winnipeg regained the lead before halftime when Lewis caught a lateral pass by Funston and ran 30 yards for another major. The Blue Bombers led 21–19 at intermission.

Hamilton quarterback Joe Zuger came out throwing in the third quarter, completing a 53-yard strike to Henley, then a 36-yard touchdown throw to Dave Viti. But Shepard responded with his second major of the game, giving Winnipeg the lead for good. Gerry James added his fourth convert for good measure. The Ticats had an opportunity to regain the lead before the end of the third quarter, but Sutherin missed on a 30-yard field goal, giving Hamilton just a single point. Both teams were held pointless in the final quarter (spread over two days) as the Bombers held on to a 28–27 lead to win their fourth title in five years.

Trivia
Afternoon fog in Toronto is a rare occurrence, but the Fog Bowl was just one of several weather disasters to occur at Exhibition Stadium. The stadium's proximity to Lake Ontario made it susceptible to rapid weather changes and extreme conditions. It remains the site of the only Major League Baseball game to be played with snow on the field (the Toronto Blue Jays' inaugural game on April 7, 1977), and the only major league baseball game to be suspended due to high wind. The 1982 Grey Cup (the Rain Bowl) was played in a driving rain. The limitations of Exhibition Stadium eventually led to the construction of the retractable-roof SkyDome, now known as Rogers Centre. During its life as a professional sports stadium, local press and Torontonians often referred to Exhibition Stadium under the moniker "Mistake by the Lake".

The 1962 Grey Cup was the first CFL contest to be broadcast by an American TV network, when ABC's Wide World of Sports carried the game in the United States. (The game, which was shown live on the CBC starting at 12:30pm in Toronto, was shown on ABC via tape delay beginning at 4:00 Eastern time. The end of the contest the next day was carried by the CBC but not ABC.) It would be the only CFL game to air on a US network until 1980, when the nascent ESPN cable network acquired American broadcast rights to the league. The first CFL game seen on ESPN was on July 9, 1980, when the Montreal defeated Toronto, 18-11.

Aftermath
The following year, the CFL adopted a new rule in case play in the Grey Cup game had to be suspended. If a suspension occurred before the end of the third quarter, it would be resumed at the same point the next day, as was done in 1962. But if the fourth quarter had already begun, the CFL commissioner would choose between two options: (a) if he considered that one team had a big lead, he would declare the game over; or (b) if the commissioner thought if the game was still close, the score would carry over to the following day -- but instead of play resuming at the point where it was left off, two ten-minute halves would be played, each starting with a kickoff.

Eventually, the CFL adopted a more complex set of rules for weather postponements.

See also
Game 5 of the 2008 World Series - a game in which weather conditions also led to its suspension until the next day.

References

Sources

Further reading
 

50
1962 in Canadian football
Winnipeg Blue Bombers
Hamilton Tiger-Cats
Grey Cups hosted in Toronto
1962 in Toronto
1962 in Canadian television
December 1962 sports events in Canada
50th Grey Cup